The Wild Dog Mountains are a rugged area of 104 km2 of the Blue Mountains of New South Wales. The mountains are located in the Blue Mountains National Park

The name was assigned in 2004

References

Geography of the Blue Mountains (New South Wales)